Margrietus Johannes "Max" van den Berg (born 22 March 1946) is a Dutch politician and member of the Dutch Labour Party. From 1979 to 1986 he was the chairman of that party and from 1999 to 2007 he was a Member of the European Parliament. From 2007 to 2016, he was the King's Commissioner in Groningen, until 2013 as Queen's Commissioner.

Early life
Margrietus Johannes van den Berg was born on 22 March 1946 in Ammerstol in the Netherlands.

His high school was the Carmelieten Paters in Oldenzaal. In 1969 he received his degree in sociology in Groningen, where he specialized in urban planning and political science. From 1969 to 1970 he was an academic staff member and lecturer at the sociology faculty of the University of Groningen.

Political career

From 1 September 1970 to 5 September 1978, Max van den Berg was an alderman in Groningen; the last six years of which he was also the deputy mayor of Groningen.

From 26 April 1979 to 25 April 1986, he was the chairman of the Labour Party.

From 1986 to 1999 he was the secretary-general of the non-governmental organisation Novib.

From 20 July 1999 to 1 September 2007, he was a Member of the European Parliament. He was the leader of the PvdA delegation in the European Parliament, and from 1999 to 2004 he was also vice-chairman of the Committee on Development and Cooperation. He is also a substitute for the Committee on International Trade and the Subcommittee on Human Rights, vice-chair of the delegation for relations with the countries of the Andean Community, a substitute for the delegation to the ACP-EU Joint Parliamentary Assembly, and a member of the temporary committee on policy challenges and budgetary means of the enlarged Union 2007–2013.

Organisations
Max van den Berg is or was a member of several organisations:
 Member of Eurostep (1990–1999)
 Member of Oxfam International (1995–1999)
 Member of the board of governors of the African Studies Centre, Leiden
 Member of the management board of the Jan Vrijman Foundation
 Chairman of the management board, Theater Zeebelt, The Hague
 Member of the management board of Wereldomroep (Radio Netherlands International), Zeist
 Member of the management board of the Design Academy, Eindhoven

Honours 
 Officer in the Order of Orange-Nassau (2016)
 Honorary citizen of Groningen (2016)

References

External links

  Max van den Berg (official website)

1946 births
Living people
Aldermen of Groningen
Chairmen of the Labour Party (Netherlands)
Dutch civil servants
King's and Queen's Commissioners of Groningen
Labour Party (Netherlands) MEPs
Labour Party (Netherlands) politicians
MEPs for the Netherlands 1999–2004
MEPs for the Netherlands 2004–2009
Municipal councillors of Groningen (city)
Officers of the Order of Orange-Nassau
People from Bergambacht